Jefferson Park is a neighborhood in Pasadena, California. It is bordered by Orange Grove Boulevard to the north, Walnut Street to the south, Hill Avenue to the west, and Allen Avenue to the east.

Landmarks
At the center of Jefferson Park is Jefferson Elementary School, the adjacent park of the same name, and Interstate 210. There is some commercial development on Walnut Street and Allen Avenue.

Education
Jefferson Park is served by Jefferson Elementary School, Eliot Middle School, and Pasadena High School.

Transportation
The Metro Gold Line has a station on Allen Avenue at the 210 Freeway. Jefferson Park is also served by Metro Local line 686; as well as Pasadena Transit routes 10 and 40.

Neighborhoods in Pasadena, California